Olga Danilović and Kaja Juvan were the defending champions, but both players chose not to participate.

Wang Xinyu and Wang Xiyu won the title, defeating Caty McNally and Whitney Osuigwe in the final, 6–2, 6–1.

Seeds

Draw

Finals

Top half

Bottom half

External links 
 Draw

Girls' Doubles
Wimbledon Championship by year – Girls' doubles